Loren Kinney (born ) is an American wheelchair curler.

Teams

Awards
  Sportsmanship Award, Women: .

References

External links 

Living people
1959 births
American female curlers
American wheelchair curlers
21st-century American women